Gilead Sher (born 2 June 1953) is an Israeli attorney who served as Chief of Staff and Policy Coordinator to Israel's former Prime Minister and Minister of Defense, Ehud Barak. In that capacity he acted as one of Israel's senior peace negotiator in 1999–2001, at the Camp David summit in 2000 and the Taba talks in 2001, as well as in extensive rounds of covert negotiations with the Palestinians.

Early life and education
Sher was born on 2 June 1953 in Kibbutz Mahanayim, Israel. Sher, on his mother's side, is a descendant of the Sephardic Baruch Mizrachi family, which has resided in Jerusalem since 1620. On his father's side, Sher's grandfather, Avraham Sher (Ser) was killed in action as an Haganah combatant in the 1948 Arab–Israeli War in 1947. Sher is a graduate of the Hebrew University Law School and was admitted to the Israel Bar Association in 1981. He has also completed courses in project finance at the World Bank (1996) and at Harvard University (1999) as well as Battalion Commanders and Brigade Commanders courses in the Israel Defense Forces.

Military service
Sher is a colonel (reserve), a former brigade commander and deputy division commander in the Armored Corps of the Israel Defense Forces, as well as a military judge.

Personal life
Sher is married to Ruth and has four children. He has two siblings as well.

Professional career
Alongside his law practice, Sher leads the Center for Applied Negotiations (CAN) at the Tel Aviv Institute for National Security Studies (INSS), which he joined in 2012 as a senior research fellow Institute for National Security Studies (INSS) in Tel Aviv, ranked among the five leading think tanks in the Middle East.

Journalist and news presenter
Sher started his career as a news editor and radio news presenter for Kol Yisrael, where he subsequently served as a parliamentary and legal correspondent, and was the radio's correspondent in Paris from 1981 to 1983.

Legal career
Sher founded the law firm Gilead Sher, Talhami & Co. in 1989. The firm has offices in both Tel Aviv and Jerusalem. Between 2005 and 2010, as a result of a merger, Sher became a senior founding partner at Aaronsohn, Sher, Aboulafia, Amoday and Co., which was ranked amongst Israel's 20 largest law firms. His main fields of expertise are corporate law, project finance, constitutional and administrative law, international business ventures, investments and transactions, dispute resolution and both private and public international law.

Academic career
From 2001 - 2011, Sher taught annually as a guest lecturer at the Wharton School of the University of Pennsylvania. His lectures focused on dispute resolution and negotiations in times of crisis. In 2007-2013 Sher also taught at the Tel Aviv University as an adjunct professor, delivering seminars at the international and local M.A. programs in conflict resolution and mediation. He has also lectured at Harvard NYU, Tufts and Northwestern universities in the United States, the University of Windsor in Canada, La Sapienza and Luiss universities in Rome, San Pablo and Universidad Francisco Marroquín in Guatemala, and has been a guest speaker at the master's degree studies of Progetto SABB for excellence in Assisi, Italy. Harvard Law School and Harvard's Program on Negotiations appointed attorney Sher of Gilead Sher, Talhami & Co., Law Offices in Tel Aviv as lecturer on law for the 2016 fall semester. Sher will spend September through October in Cambridge, Mass.

Peace process
Sher's involvement in Middle East peace efforts started during the tenure of the late Prime Minister Yitzhak Rabin, when as a reserve IDF colonel he was appointed to the negotiation project at the Planning Directorate of the IDF and served as delegate to the talks on the Oslo Accords. He was later appointed by Israel's Prime Minister and Minister of Defense Ehud Barak in 1999 to negotiate the Sharm el-Sheikh Memorandum which was signed on 4 September 1999 between Israel and the PLO. He was subsequently appointed head of the negotiation team at the Camp David peace summit which was convened by former US President Bill Clinton.

Sher also served as a co-chief peace negotiator at the Taba peace talks of 2001, as well as in extensive rounds of covert peace negotiations with the Palestinians. Sher's efforts for peace were recognized by former US President Clinton who thanked him for his "heavy labor for a different future for your people and your neighbors". Sher was appointed Chevalier de l'Ordre national du Merite in 2002 by the former President of France, Jacques Chirac, as appreciation for his efforts to promote peace in the Middle East.

Sher gives an account of his involvement in the peace process in his book The Israeli-Palestinian Peace Negotiations 1999–2001, Within Reach which was published in Hebrew in 2001, translated into Arabic and published in English by Routledge/Taylor & Francis Group in 2006.

Government
Sher served as Chief of Staff of the Prime Minister and the Minister of Defense and was the PM's policy coordinator from 2000 to 2001.

Civil society activities
Since 2013, Sher has chaired the executive board of Sapir Academic College, the largest public college in Israel and he is also the chairman of the board of trustees of the college. He is a member of the Council for Peace and Security and the Association of Civil Rights in Israel (ACRI) (a board member from 1990 to 1991 and from 2007 to 2011) and is a founding member of the Citizen Empowerment Center in Israel. He also serves as co-chairman of Blue White Future, which he helped establish in 2009. He served as chairman of the board of the Sam Spiegel School Film and Television in Jerusalem and as board member at Budo For Peace—co-existence for peace through martial arts.

Books and other publications
Sher writes books, articles, op-eds, studies and research in national and international media. His book The Israeli-Palestinian Peace Negotiations, 1999-2001: Within Reach was published in Hebrew, Arabic and English. In 2015, he co-edited Negotiating in Times of Conflict. in April 2016 Sher published The Battle for Home with Yedioth Ahronoth.

Sporting achievements
Sher is a former president of the Israel Ohshima Shotokan Karate Association, holding fifth Dan, the highest possible grade in the school, and has taught martial arts since 1984. During high school, Sher was a national level athlete in high jump and pentathlon.

References

External links

The Israeli-Palestinian Peace Negotiations, 1999-2001 Within Reach

Articles by Gilead Sher
 Negotiating in Times of Conflict Tel Aviv: Institute for National Security Studies, 2015
 A modest approach to settling the Israeli-Palestinian conflict, The Washington Post, 17 December 2015
 ISRAEL AND PALESTINE: IT’S TIME FOR JOHN KERRY TO ACT, Newsweek, 28 November 2015
 The speech Bibi should have made at the U.N, JEWISH JOURNAL, 16 October 2015
 "Израиль близок к братоубийственной войне". Интервью с Гиладом Шером, NEWSru, 7 July 2015
 Israel Faces Battles on Many Fronts, but Prospects for Peace Remain, RELIGION AND ETHICS, 25 February 2015
 Wanted: An Israeli anti-‘lawfare’ strategy, 6 THE JERUSALEM REPORT, 9 February 2015
 The partition plan, THE JERUSALEM REPORT, 2 June 2014
 A Proactive Policy for Israel: A Commentary on "Is Unilateralism Always Bad?", Negotiation Journal April 2014

Israeli lawyers
Living people
1953 births